Urocordylinae is an extinct subfamily of lepospondyl amphibians that includes several small newt-like species with short skulls and elongated, flattened tails. Urocordylinae belongs to the family Urocordylidae, which also includes the subfamily Sauropleurinae. Urocordylines lived during the Late Carboniferous and fossils are known from North America and Europe. The best-known urocordyline is Urocordylus from Ireland.

References

Holospondyls
Carboniferous amphibians
Pennsylvanian first appearances
Pennsylvanian extinctions